Aliatypus californicus is a species in the spider family Antrodiaetidae, also called the family of folding trapdoor spiders. It is found in the United States.

References

Antrodiaetidae
Articles created by Qbugbot
Spiders described in 1896